Deadly force also known as lethal force is force that is likely to cause either serious bodily injury or death to another person. It may also refer to:

Deadly Force (film), 1983 American action film
Deadly Force (TV series), 2000 Russian crime series